Frank Nicholas Riley (July 3, 1887 – October 30, 1950) was an American athlete, and member of the Irish American Athletic Club. He was a member of the U.S. Olympic team in the 1908 Summer Olympics in London.

"He ran third in the 1,500 meter run at the Olympic try-outs held in Franklin Fielid, Philadelphia, but did not place in the finals in London. At the Metropolitan A.A.U. Junior championships Riley won the mile title and later in the year ran a slashing race in the 880 yard Canadian championship, taking second place and forcing Emilio Lunghi to break the record. Riley was a prominent member of the Thirteenth Regiment A.A. and competed successfully on their relay team."

In the 1908 Summer Olympics - 1500 meters, Riley did not finish his initial semifinal heat and did not advance to the final.

Notes

References

External links
Archives of Irish America - NYU
Winged Fist Organization

1887 births
1950 deaths
Athletes (track and field) at the 1908 Summer Olympics
Olympic track and field athletes of the United States
American male middle-distance runners